The Music Band 2 is an album by War, the second in their "Music Band" series, released on MCA Records in  November 1979.

War had more personnel changes since the previous album in the series, earlier in 1979.  Charles Miller (saxophone) left after recording one song, replaced by Pat Rizzo (ex Sly and the Family Stone) who is credited with playing "horns".  The following year, Miller became the victim of an unsolved murder.  Another new member was Ron Hammon on drums; the group now had three drummers, the others being Harold Brown and Papa Dee Allen (on congas).  Alice Tweed Smith, who was credited as Tweed Smith on the previous album, is Alice Tweed Smyth on this one; she is included in the composer credits for the first time (with spelling of Smith), but only on one track.  Songwriter credits can be used to determine who played on which tracks (producer Jerry Goldstein is often credited as well), although Smith may be singing background vocals on tracks for which she is not credited, Rizzo and Luther Rabb are not included in the credits for one song (and possibly doesn't play on it), and one track is a new version of an old song with its original songwriting credits. The song "I'll take care of you" is used in film Youngblood as an instrumental and isn't on the soundtrack.

The cover was printed using elaborate methods as used on the previous album in the series: a background painted solid green (instead of using a four-colour printing press), with metallic gold print (plus black print on the back), and embossing.  An innersleeve has colour photos of the group, two from the same photo shoot session, each with eight of nine group members: Papa Dee Allen is absent from one, and Alice Tweed Smith from the other.  As was the case in the previous album, the back cover shows songs in a different order from their actual appearance.  The plain but elaborate cover art concept continued with the next album in the series, The Music Band Live (1980) which has a black cover.

Two singles were issued from the album: "Don't Take It Away" in 1979, and "I'll Be Around" in 1980.  Both have the same B-side, "The Music Band 2 (We are the Music Band)".

Track listing

Side one
"Don't Take It Away" (Papa Dee Allen, Harold Brown, Jerry Goldstein, Ron Hammon, Lonnie Jordan, Lee Oskar, Luther Rabb, Pat Rizzo, Howard E. Scott, Alice Tweed Smith) – 6:45
"I'll Be Around" (Allen, Brown, Hammon, Jordan, Oskar, Rabb, Rizzo, Scott) – 6:34
"I'll Take Care of You" (Allen, Brown, Jordan, Charles Miller, Oskar, Scott) – 8:48

Side two
"Night People" (Allen, Brown, Goldstein, Hammon, Jordan, Oskar, Rabb, Rizzo, Scott) – 6:30
"The World is a Ghetto (special all new instrumental version)" (Allen, Brown, B.B. Dickerson, Jordan, Miller, Oskar, Scott) – 13:47
"The Music Band 2 (We are the Music Band)" (Allen, Brown, Hammon, Jordan, Oskar, Rabb, Rizzo, Scott) – 3:10

Personnel
War
Papa Dee Allen – percussion, vocals
Harold Brown – drums, percussion, vocals
Ron Hammon – drums, vocals
Lonnie Jordan – organ, piano, synthesizer, guitar, percussion, vocals
Lee Oskar – harmonicas, vocals
Luther Rabb – bass, vocals
Pat Rizzo – horns, vocals
Howard Scott – guitar, vocals
Alice Tweed Smyth – percussion, vocals
Charles Miller – saxophone on "I'll Take Care of You"

Technical personnel
Jerry Goldstein with Lonnie Jordon in association with Howard Scott – producers
Chris Huston – recording and remix engineer
Jeff Eccles, Russell Schmitt, Doug Pakes, Don Smith – second engineers
Wally Traugett – mastering
Richard Gibbs – synthesizer programs
George Osaki, Lee Oskar – art direction
Alan Bergman – photography

1979 albums
War (American band) albums
MCA Records albums
Albums produced by Jerry Goldstein (producer)